Razia Sheikh is an Indian former track and field athlete, who competed in javelin throw. She was the first Indian woman to cross the barrier of 50 metres, which she did at the 1987 South Asian Games. She represented India at two editions of the Asian Games (1982 Delhi and 1986 Seoul).

Career 
Sheikh broke the national record for best throw by an Indian female javelin thrower when she broke Elizabeth Davenport's 21-year-old record in 1986 with a throw of 47.70 metres at the Playmakers' athletics meet in Delhi.

At the 1987 South Asian Games in Kolkata, Sheikh threw 50.38 metres setting a new Games and national record bettering her mark of 47.80 metres. She won gold at the event.

References 

Living people
1950s births
Athletes from Gujarat
Sportswomen from Gujarat
Indian female javelin throwers
South Asian Games gold medalists for India
South Asian Games silver medalists for India
South Asian Games medalists in athletics
Athletes (track and field) at the 1982 Asian Games
Athletes (track and field) at the 1986 Asian Games
Asian Games competitors for India